Halina Buyno-Łoza (12 December 1907, Łódź – 13 September 1991, Wrocław), also known separately with each last name, was a Polish theatre actress and dancer. She is also known for being imprisoned after making public her former role as an informant for the Polish Ministry of Public Security on her colleagues at the Municipal Theatre.

Education and career
In 1937 she graduated from the National Institute of Dramatic Art in Warsaw. Before World War II, she was an actress at the Vilnius City Theatre. After the war, she was recruited by the communist Polish government's Security Service to act as an informant for "anti-state crimes", especially among her colleagues at the Municipal Theatre. After a few years, she became worried about what would happen to her friends in the theatre industry if she continued, so she outed herself to others of her actions. In response, from 1952 to 1953, the Polish authorities sentenced her to 1.5 years in prison, but she was released after nine months as amnesty after the death of Joseph Stalin. It was reported later by other inmates of the prison that Buyno-Łoza had been physically abused by the Soviet guards in charge. She later performed at the Polish Theatre in Wroclaw until her retirement in 1971.

Arts and film
She performed at the Municipal Theatre in Vilnius (1937–1939), the Municipal Theatre of Lublin (1945–1952), Theatre of Lower Silesia in Jelenia Góra (1953–1955) and the Polish Theatre in Wrocław (1955–1971). She also played roles in films. She was married to the actor Mieczysław Łoza. She was buried in the Osobowice Cemetery in Wrocław.

Initially she played roles of everyday women – rather noisy, sometimes offensive, but always kind-hearted. Later her roles included grandmothers and neighbours, including Aniela Kargul in Sylwester Chęciński's trilogy.

Filmography

References

External links
 Halina Buyno-Łoza on IMDb

1907 births
1991 deaths
Polish actresses
Actors from Łódź